The Battle of Rapallo, was fought between Swiss mercenaries on French pay and their Genoese-Milanese allies led by Louis d'Orleans against Neapolitan forces led by Giulio Orsini on 5 September 1494 near Rapallo.

Rapallo was occupied by 4,000 Neapolitan troops on 3 September 1494 with Giulio Orsini, Obietto Fieschi, and Fregosino Campofregoso in command, their plan being to force a rebellion in Genoa. Later the Neapolitan fleet was forced away by bad weather. On 5 September, Louis d'Orleans landed with 1,000 Swiss mercenary infantry which was later reinforced overland by 2,000 more Swiss mercenaries and a contingent of Genoese-Milanese infantry.

A skirmish broke out between the Swiss mercenaries and Neapolitan forces, though the terrain did not allow for the Swiss to form up their pike squares. However, the battle was mainly fought between the Genoese-Milanese and Neapolitan infantry. Following concentrated artillery fire from the French fleet, the Neapolitans were routed. The Swiss massacred Neapolitans trying to surrender, although Orsini and Campofregoso were captured in the retreat.

After the battle the Swiss mercenaries killed the enemy wounded and sacked the town of Rapallo. Though a small battle, it was seen as a significant victory which halted Neapolitan attempts to incite a rebellion in Genoa against the French.

References

Sources

1494 in Europe
15th century in the Kingdom of Naples
Rapallo
Rapallo 1494
Rapallo 1494
Rapallo 1494
Battles in Liguria
Rapallo
Italian War of 1494–1495